The Neva is a  torrent or stream of Piemonte and Liguria (Italy).

Geography 
The creek is formed in Piemonte (comune of Garessio) near the Monte Galero, in the Ligurian Prealps. It then flows southeast and after a few kilometres it enters in Liguria crossing the territories of Erli, Castelvecchio di Rocca Barbena and Zuccarello. A little upstream of Cisano sul Neva it gets from the right hand its main tributary, the Pennavaira. Close to its mouth the Neva is crossed by State highway Aurelia bis and Autostrada dei Fiori. In Leca (comune of Albenga), joining the Arroscia, it forms the Centa, one of the most relevant rivers of Liguria.

Neva basin (140 km2) is mainly included in the Province of Savona, with a little part located in its NW side belonging to Piemonte.

Main tributaries 
 Right hand:
 rio Bossolasco,
 torrente Pennavaira,
 rio Sant'Antonio.
 Left hand:
 rio Collarea,
 rio Vernea,
 rio Ciosi.

Discharge 

The discharge of the Neva is extremely variable, characterized by violent floods during the autumn and long periods of low flows during the summer.

References

See also
 List of rivers of Italy

Rivers of Italy
Rivers of the Province of Savona
Rivers of the Province of Cuneo
Rivers of the Alps